Tomáš Možný (born April 26, 1991) is a Slovakian kickboxer, currently competing in the heavyweight division of Glory.

Kickboxing career

Early career
Možný participated in the 2016 Fight Night Saint-Tropez Heavyweight Tournament, which was held on August 4, 2018. Možný was booked to face the former Enfusion champion Daniel Sam in the quarterfinals of the one-day tournament. He won the fight by unanimous decision. Možný advanced to the finals, where he faced Thomas Vanneste. He won the fight by unanimous decision.

After debuting with Glory, Možný faced Alen Kapetanovic at Rebuy Stars Fight Night on June 3, 2017. He won the fight by unanimous decision. Možný next faced Daniel Sam at Fight Night Saint-Tropez on August 4, 2017. He lost the rematch by unanimous decision.

Glory
Možný returned to Glory following a fourteen-month absence from the sport. He faced Daniel Škvor at Glory 51: Rotterdam on March 3, 2018. Možný won the fight by unanimous decision.

Možný faced Tomasz Sarara for the World Kickboxing Network World Super Heavyweight Championship at NGP: Piatkowska vs. Lindberg on May 25, 2018. He won the fight by a fourth-round technical knockout.

Možný faced Jahfarr Wilnis, in the quarterfinals of the 2018 Glory Heavyweight tournament, at Glory 62: Rotterdam on December 8, 2018. He lost the fight by split decision.

Možný faced Antonio Plazibat at Glory 69: Düsseldorf on October 12, 2019. He lost the fight by unanimous decision, with all five judges scoring the fight 29-25 for Plazibat.

Možný was booked to face Levi Rigters at Glory 78: Arnhem on September 4, 2021. He lost the fight by a third-round technical knockout, as he was stopped by low kicks.

Možný was expected to face Romeo Benadi at RFA: Warm Up on March 12, 2022. Benadi later withdrew for undisclosed reasons and was replaced by Michal Reissinger. Možný won the fight by a first-round technical knockout.

Mixed martial arts career
Možný made his KSW debut against Arkadiusz Wrzosek at KSW 79 on February 25, 2023. He lost the bout via unanimous decision.

Championships and accomplishments
Fight Night Saint-Tropez
Fight Night Saint-Tropez Heavyweight Tournament Winner
NGP Promotions
NGP Openweight Championship
One successful title defense
Glory
2019 Fight of the Year

Mixed martial arts record

|Loss
|align=center|1–2
|Arkadiusz Wrzosek
|Decision (unanimous)
|KSW 79: De Fries vs. Duffee
|
|align=center|3
|align=center| 5:00
|Liberec, Czech Republic
|-
| Win 
| align=center| 1–1
| Kamil Minda
| TKO (punches)
| RFA 4: Kosice
|  
| align=center| 2
| align=center| 4:07
| Košice, Slovakia
| 
|-
| Loss
| align=center| 0–1
| Hubert Lech
| DQ
| NoF 2 - Laincz vs. Jakopic
|  
| align=center| 1
| align=center| 
| Prešov, Slovakia
| 
|-

Kickboxing record

|- style="background:"
|-  style="background:#cfc;"
| 2022-03-12 || Win ||align=left| Michal Reissinger || RFA: Warm Up || Bratislava, Slovakia || TKO (Punches) || 1 || 
|-
|- bgcolor="#fbb"
| 2021-09-04 || Loss || align="left" | Levi Rigters || Glory 78: Rotterdam || Rotterdam, Netherlands || TKO (Low kicks) || 3 || 1:02 
|-
|- bgcolor="#fbb"
| 2019-10-12 || Loss || align="left" | Antonio Plazibat || Glory 69: Düsseldorf || Düsseldorf, Germany || Decision (Unanimous) || 3 || 3:00 
|-
|- bgcolor="#fbb"
| 2018-12-08 || Loss || align="left" | Jahfarr Wilnis || Glory 62: Rotterdam, Tournament Quarterfinals || Rotterdam, Netherlands || Decision (Split) || 3 || 3:00 
|-
|- bgcolor="#fbb"
| 2018-05-25 || Loss || align="left" | Tomasz Sarara || NGP: Piatkowska vs. Lindberg || Warsaw, Poland || TKO (Referee stoppage) || 4 || 
|-
! style=background:white colspan=9 |
|- 
|-  style="background:#cfc;"
| 2018-03-03 || Win ||align=left| Daniel Škvor || Glory 51: Rotterdam || Rotterdam, Netherlands || Decision (Unanimous) || 3 || 3:00
|-
|-  style="background:#cfc;"
| 2017-10-14 || Win ||align=left| Ayman Hassanin || Simply the Best 16 || Košice, Slovakia || TKO ||  || 
|-
|-  style="background:#fbb;"
| 2017-08-04 || Loss ||align=left| Daniel Sam || Fight Night Saint-Tropez || Saint-Tropez, France || Decision (Unanimous) || 3 || 3:00
|-
|-  style="background:#cfc;"
| 2017-06-03 || Win ||align=left| Alen Kapetanovic || Rebuy Stars Fight Night || Košice, Slovakia || Decision (Unanimous) || 3 || 3:00
|-
|- bgcolor="#fbb"
| 2017-01-20  || Loss || align="left" | Jhonata Diniz || Glory 37: Los Angeles || Los Angeles, United States || Decision (Unanimous) || 3 || 3:00 
|-
|-  style="background:#cfc;"
| 2016-08-04 || Win|| align="left" | Thomas Vanneste || Fight Night Saint-Tropez, Tournament Final || Saint-Tropez, France || Decision (Unanimous) || 3 || 3:00 
|-
! style=background:white colspan=9 |
|- 
|-  style="background:#cfc;"
| 2016-08-04 || Win|| align="left" | Daniel Sam || Fight Night Saint-Tropez, Tournament Semifinal || Saint-Tropez, France || Decision (Unanimous) || 3 || 3:00 
|-
|-  style="background:#cfc;"
| 2016-04-16 || Win|| align="left" | Cihad Kepenek || Glory 29: Copenhagen || Copenhagen, Denmark || Ext. R. Decision (Unanimous) || 4 || 3:00 
|-

|-  bgcolor="#fbb"
| 2015-12-12 || Loss||align=left| Martin Pacas || Diamonds Fight Night II || Liptovský Mikuláš, Slovakia || Ext.R Decision || 4 || 3:00

|-  style="background:#cfc;"
| 2015-10-16 || Win|| align="left" | Arkadiusz Wrzosek || NGP: Boxing Night 11 || Warsaw, Poland || Decision (Unanimous) || 5 || 3:00 
|-
! style=background:white colspan=9 |
|- 
|- bgcolor="#c5d2ea"
| 2015-10-03 || Draw || align="left" | Mathieu Kongolo || Simply The Best 6  || Poprad, Slovakia || Decision  || 5 || 3:00 
|-
! style=background:white colspan=9 |
|- 
|-  style="background:#cfc;"
| 2015-06-12 || Win|| align="left" | Michał Wlazło || NGP: Boxing Night 10 || Częstochowa, Poland || TKO (Doctor stoppage) || 2 || 
|-
! style=background:white colspan=9 |
|- 
|- bgcolor="#fbb"
| 2015-05-23 || Loss || align="left" | David Vinš || Simply the Best 4  || Ústí nad Labem, Czech Republic || Decision (Unanimous) || 3 || 3:00 
|-
! style=background:white colspan=9 |
|- 
|-  style="background:#cfc;"
| 2014-01- || Win|| align="left" | David Mora || East Pro Fight 3 || Košice, Slovakia || Decision || 3 || 3:00
|-
|- bgcolor="#fbb"
| 2012-10-27|| Loss || align="left" | Roman Kryklia || Nitrianska noc bojovníkov 2012 || Prague, Czech Republic || Decision  || 3 || 3:00 
|-
|- bgcolor="#fbb"
| 2012-09-02 || Loss || align="left" | Dževad Poturak || K-1 Rules: Sarajevo Fight Night 3 || Sarajevo, Bosnia and Herzegovina || Decision (Split) || 3 || 3:00 
|-

See also
 List of male kickboxers

References

1991 births
Living people
Slovak male kickboxers
Heavyweight kickboxers
Glory kickboxers
Slovak male mixed martial artists
Heavyweight mixed martial artists
Mixed martial artists utilizing kickboxing
Sportspeople from Košice